Hoya obscura is a fast-growing hoya from the Philippines.  Characterized by medium-sized veined leaves that range from deep green when grown in shade, to a deep reddish color when grown in sunlight.  This hoya is very easy to grow.

Description
 Growing habit: Viny and compact, leaves fairly close together along new shoots.  Very fast grower in optimal conditions. Extremely floriferous.
 Sap color: milky.
 Leaf size: 2 cm to 10 cm.
 Epiphytic: Epiphytic to semi-epiphytic in the wild.  Readily adapts to pot culture.
 Fragrance: Intense and pleasant, remarkably like a buttered cinnamon roll for the plant pictured. Wafts a considerable distance.  Many people have likened the fragrance to Froot Loops cereal.  
 Soil conditions: Must be moist but well-drained and airy.  The specimen pictured is generally allowed to dry completely between waterings, and is rootbound in a 3-inch terra cotta pot.
 Outdoor zone: At least Zone 10, possibly cooler.

obscura
Epiphytes
Hoyas of the Philippines